Sophie Armitstead (born 27 October 1994) is an Australian rules footballer who played for the Adelaide Football Club in the AFL Women's competition.

Early life and career
Armitstead won the 2015 NTFL Women's Rising Star Award playing for Wanderers, but her career before the AFLW was soured by knee injuries, as she injured her ACL in 2012 and tore her meniscus in 2015, both in the same knee.

AFLW career (2017–18)
Armitstead was drafted by Adelaide with their seventh selection and fifty-fifth overall in the 2016 AFL Women's draft. Due to her knee injury, the club announced in May that she was not offered a contract for the 2018 season, however in October it was announced that she would return to the club for the 2018 season under free agency rules. She was delisted again by Adelaide at the end of the 2018 season.

References

External links 

1994 births
Living people
Adelaide Football Club (AFLW) players
Australian rules footballers from the Northern Territory